La Flor Dominicana (Dominican Flower) is a "boutique-style" cigar brand The cigars were manufactured by Tabacalera La Flor S.A. and were first produced in Santiago, Dominican Republic in 1996. The company was founded by Litto Gomez, a former jeweler turned cigar maker who established the business after being robbed at gunpoint of about $400,000 worth of jewelry in Miami. 

The company currently operates its factory in Tamboril, located in the Dominican Republic.

History

The La Flor Dominicana brand was first known as Los Libertadores. The name of the brand was inspired by the flower of the tobacco plant which signifies that the growing cycle is complete and the plant is ready for reproduction. In 1999, the factory produced about 2.5 million cigars, up from 2.4 million in 1998 growing substantially from the 300,000 cigars produced in the first year of operations. Subsequently, the company made 1.5 million cigars in 2004, 1.9 million in 2005, and 2.9 million in 2006. It likely surpassed the 4 million cigar mark by the present time.

Gomez acquired a  farm where he grows tobacco for his use; in 2006 he also acquired a smaller  farm used for the growth of Corojo and Sumatra.

In the beginning the company only focused on growing binder and filler tobacco however in 2002 they started cultivating shade grown wrapper; sun grown and encallado are also grown to satisfy binder and filler production needs.

In 1999, the company had a serious fire in the cigar room at its factory and according to Gomez, the company lost about 400,000 cigars.

References

Cigar brands